Samir Mahmoud Ahmed Gouda (born 3 May 1972) is an Egyptian-Ukrainian former professional basketball player and current coach. He currently serves as an assistant coach for Zamalek of the Egyptian Super League. Gouda played at the center position. As a player, Gouda represented his country's national team, as he was a member of the senior Egyptian national team.

Professional career
Gouda started his pro club career in 1994, with the Piratas de Quebradillas, in Puerto Rico's Baloncesto Superior Nacional (BSN) league. In 1995, he moved to Greece to play, and he would go on to spend four seasons playing there, with four different teams. In 1999, Gouda joined the Lebanese League club Al Riyadi Beirut, and he joined the Egyptian club Zamalek, in 2000. 

In 2003, Gouda signed with the Turkish Super League club Fenerbahçe. Gouda finished his pro club playing career back in Egypt, with Al Ahly, in 2010.

National team career
Gouda played with the senior men's Egyptian national team at the 1994 FIBA World Championship. He tied a tournament record for the most rebounds in a game, with 16 rebounds, in a 76–69 win over Canada. Gouda also won bronze medals with Egypt at the 2001 FIBA Africa Championship and the 2003 FIBA Africa Championship.

References

External links
Samir Gouda at afrobasket.com
Samir Gouda at archive.fiba.com
Samir Gouda at bsnpr.com 
Samir Gouda at Eurobasket.com
Samir Gouda at RealGM.com
Samir Gouda at tblstat.net

1972 births
Living people
1994 FIBA World Championship players
Achilleas Kaimakli players
Al Ahly basketball players
Al-Ittihad SC Aleppo men's basketball players
Al Riyadi Club Beirut basketball players
Al Wasl SC men's basketball players
Apollon Limassol BC players
Aris B.C. players
Centers (basketball)
Egyptian basketball coaches
Egyptian men's basketball players
Fenerbahçe men's basketball players
Irakleio B.C. players
People from Dakahlia Governorate
Peristeri B.C. players
Piratas de Quebradillas players
Sagesse SC basketball players
Ukrainian men's basketball coaches
Ukrainian men's basketball players
VAO B.C. players
Zamalek SC basketball players